Everybody's Golf, known in North America as Hot Shots Golf and in Japan as  is the first game in the Everybody's Golf series. It was the only game in the series to be developed by Camelot Software Planning, which later developed the Mario Golf series.

Gameplay
Players can acquire additional golfers for use by defeating them in VS mode, with a total of ten golfers available.

Reception

The game received favorable reviews according to the review aggregation website GameRankings. Next Generation called it "the type of golf game that's sure to liven up any PlayStation party and be enjoyed by gamers and golf fans alike." In Japan, Famitsu gave it a score of 30 out of 40. GamePro said, "Lacking name recognition or even normal-sized players, Hot Shots Golf may at first seem destined for the bin marked 'mediocre.' But this fun, challenging golf game has an engine that the pros would be proud of and all the makings of a legendary link-splitter."

Game Informer ranked it as the 87th best game made for their 100th issue in August 2001 despite past criticisms that it was not a golf simulator. They praised it for its balance between simplicity and complexity.

According to Famitsu, the game was Japan's sixth-best-selling game of 1997, with sales of 1.02 million units.

The game was a finalist for the Academy of Interactive Arts & Sciences' 1998 "Sports Game of the Year" award, which went to 1080° Snowboarding. The game won the award for "Best Sports Game" at the 1998 OPM Editors' Awards, and was nominated for the "Best Multiplayer Game" award, which went to Devil Dice.

Notes

References

External links
 

1997 video games
Camelot Software Planning games
Golf video games
PlayStation (console) games
PlayStation (console)-only games
Sony Interactive Entertainment games
Everybody's Golf
Video games scored by Motoi Sakuraba
Video games developed in Japan